F/X2 is a 1991 American action thriller film.

FX2 may also refer to:
 Paramotor Inc FX2, a powered paraglider
 Yashica FX-2, a Japanese 35mm SLR camera
 Austin FX2 London Black Cab, a prototype version of the Austin FX3
 FX+2, a time-shifted version of Australian TV channel FX
 "FX 2.0", a 2002 instrumental by Jake Kaufman

See also

 Casio FX 1.0/2.0 series graphic calculators
 FX (disambiguation)
 FXX (disambiguation)
 JavaFX, which has a version 2.0
 Pinball FX 2, a 2010 Xbox videogame